Norman Lee (March 21, 1921 – December 6, 1978) was an American songwriter, jazz clarinetist, and big band singer of the 1950s to 1970s.

Early life 
Born Norman Uehle in Danville, Iowa, Lee was raised in nearby Correctionville, Iowa. His mother, Alice Lee, was also a musician.

Career 
Lee is best known for his collaboration with Lawrence Welk. Lee co-authored several songs, including "Champagne Polka", with Welk. Lee also led his own group, the Norman Lee Orchestra, in Kansas. Lee also toured the United States with the Eddy Howard Orchestra and later took over the group after Howard's death.

Death 
In 1978, Lee was murdered by a former member of his band along with his wife and publicist in Wichita, Kansas.

Discography
"Slappin' Clarinet"
"Let's Go Dance Again"

References

1921 births
1978 deaths
American jazz clarinetists
Big band clarinetists
American jazz singers
American male songwriters
American murder victims
20th-century American male musicians
1978 murders in the United States
Deaths by firearm in Kansas

People from Des Moines County, Iowa
People from Woodbury County, Iowa